Advances in Group Theory and Applications (AGTA) is a peer reviewed, open access research journal in mathematics, specifically group theory. It was founded in 2015 by the council of the no-profit association AGTA - Advances in Group Theory and Applications, and is published by Aracne.

The journal is composed of three sections. The main one contains mathematical research papers, while the two other sections are respectively devoted to historical papers and open problems.

The journal is published as a diamond open access journal, meaning that the content is immediately freely available to the readers, and the authors do not have to pay any author publication fees.

The journal is abstracted and indexed by Mathematical Reviews and Zentralblatt MATH.

Sections

ADV – The History behind Group Theory

The purpose of this section is to present historical documents, biographical notes and discussions on relevant aspects of group theory and its applications.

ADV – Perspectives in Group Theory

The open problems submitted to the journal are published in this section.

Reinhold Baer Prize sponsorship
The journal started co-sponsoring the Reinhold Baer Prize in 2017.

References

External links 

 Advances in Group Theory and Applications at Aracne
 Journal website

Mathematics journals
Open access journals
Publications established in 2015